"You're Beautiful" is a song by English singer-songwriter James Blunt. It was written by Blunt, Sacha Skarbek and Amanda Ghost for Blunt's debut album, Back to Bedlam (2004). It was released as the third single of the album in 2005.

In the United Kingdom and Australia, the song reached number one and number two respectively. When released as the debut single from Back to Bedlam in Canada and the United States, it reached number one on both charts and received widespread airplay. In 2006, the song won an Ivor Novello Award for airplay. The song has sold 625,000 copies in the United Kingdom as stated by the Official Charts Company, and by October 2012 over three million in the United States. It remains Blunt's biggest hit single in the United States to date, and his only one to reach the top 40 of the Billboard Hot 100. In 2012, a new version of the single was issued in Japan. The Q;indivi+ Remix, featuring Japanese performer Keri, was issued on 28 March 2012.

The song is performed in the key of E♭ Major.

Writing and inspiration
Newspapers have claimed that "You're Beautiful" is about a former girlfriend of Blunt, Dixie Chassay, casting assistant for the Harry Potter films, although Blunt refuses to confirm or deny this. On 8 March 2006 on The Oprah Winfrey Show, Blunt said of the song, "It's kind of miserable. It was about seeing my ex-girlfriend on the Underground in London with her new man, who I didn't know existed. She and I caught eyes and lived a lifetime in that moment, but didn't do anything about it and haven't seen each other since." According to Blunt, he wrote the lyrics of the song at home in two minutes after meeting her, and then finished the song with Sacha Skarbek in Los Angeles, and with Amanda Ghost also credited as a co-writer. Blunt said of the song: "It's always been portrayed as romantic, but it’s actually a bit creepy. It’s about a guy (me) who’s high and stalking someone else’s girlfriend on the subway. And then the stalker kills himself." In an interview with HitQuarters, co-writer Sacha Skarbek said that Blunt brought the title, verses, and the approach of the chorus to a songwriting session. Skarbek's contribution largely focused on the music aspect to the track, contributing chord ideas for the verses, honing the melodies, and making sure the song stuck to, "a couple of key hooks rather than making it too complicated".

Several versions of the song exist. One lyrical version has an explicit word in it ("She could see from my face that I was fucking high") which was released on Back to Bedlam and most of the "You're Beautiful" singles. The radio edit of the song replaces the explicit lyric, changing it to "She could see from my face that I was flying high". Acoustic, live, and DVD versions have also been released. However, because of the word in question, the album was given a Parental Advisory sticker. When asked about the song, Blunt responded, "It's probably one of the least meaningful songs on the album and by no means people's favourite. The album is like a book covering various aspects of life in a specific order."

At the beginning of the song, Blunt sings the first line twice ("My life is brilliant"). The mistimed delivery was left in the final recording but omitted in most radio versions. This is parodied in "Weird Al" Yankovic's song "You're Pitiful": After the initial start, he says "What, was I too early? Oh, sorry. Should I...Do you wanna start over? Or, keep going? Okay. Now? Now?" and then begins the song again.

Music video
The music video for "You're Beautiful" was directed by Sam Brown. At least one writer's interpretation is that it shows Blunt taking his own life, perhaps following a Japanese tradition of removing one's shoes and contents of clothing prior to jumping from a great height. However, the director of the video states in a "making-of" piece of footage that "the idea [of the video] is built around the last line, where he says, 'I'll never be with you', and that idea of completely forgetting about something, of getting rid of that emotion, and moving on, and I think that the video is a sort of visual manifestation of that emotion."

Blunt removes the upper portion of his clothing in a cold, bare, snowy setting and places all of his personal belongings on the ground. While doing this, seagulls circle overhead like buzzards. At the end of the video, he jumps off a cliff and falls into the water while he sings the lyrics: "But it's time to face the truth, I will never be with you". According to Blunt, he had to jump twice and suffered a split lip in the jumps. The video was filmed in Mallorca, Spain on 23 March 2005.

On November 9, 2021, James Blunt announced the remastering to 4k resolution in YouTube on his Instagram.

The video has been parodied in a Dead Ringers spoof, with Jon Culshaw impersonating Blunt, singing the song with different lyrics where he explains how he can be cool.

Critical reception and ubiquity
About.com gave the song four and a half stars out of five, saying "The simple power of Blunt's songwriting is effective at conveying the pain of realizing he will never be with the object of his affections."

"You're Beautiful" was ranked number seven in a poll conducted by Rolling Stone magazine to identify the 10 most annoying songs. VH1 ranked it number 95 on its list of the 100 Greatest Songs of the '00s. In October 2014, Blunt stated it had become so ubiquitous that it was "force-fed down people's throats". It has been named as one of the worst songs ever recorded, despite its positive critical reviews.

Chart performance
"You're Beautiful" is Blunt's most successful single release to date. It was also his first successful single and reached number one in ten countries across the world, including the United Kingdom, the United States, Spain, Mexico, Canada, and the Netherlands. The song peaked within the top five in New Zealand, number four, Australia, number two, France, and Germany. Released on 18 May 2005, it entered at number twelve on 5 June and reached number one six weeks later where it remained for five consecutive weeks. The highest position "You're Beautiful" reached in Australia was number two, where it stayed for two consecutive weeks.

In November 2005, "You're Beautiful" was released in North America where it achieved widespread success. In Canada, it ascended to number one (where it remained for four consecutive weeks) 22 weeks following its debut on the BDS Airplay chart. In the United States, it debuted at number 88 before reaching number one 17 weeks later. It replaced Beyoncé's "Check on It" and itself was replaced by Ne-Yo's "So Sick". 

The song became the first non-urban or American Idol song to reach the top of the U.S. Billboard Hot 100 since Nickelback's "How You Remind Me" in 2001. However, "Hollaback Girl" by Gwen Stefani has also been credited for that accomplishment, but due to its hip-hop-based influences, it's been disputed. This also became the first single by a British artist to reach number one since Elton John's "Candle in the Wind 1997" (1997). It achieved success on the Billboard Pop 100, Hot Digital Songs, Adult Contemporary, and Adult Top 40 formats. It has been certified double platinum by the RIAA for digital and platinum for mastertone. It has sold over three million in the United States.

Awards
The song received three nominations at the 2007 Grammy Awards: Record of the Year, Song of the Year and Best Male Pop Vocal Performance.

The song won the BMI Internet Award for most plays on BMI-licensed websites in 2007 and was the first song to receive this honor at BMI's London Awards.

Release
The single was released in four official physical formats. CD1 includes an exclusive acoustic recording of "Fall at Your Feet", a cover taken from the BBC Radio 1 live lounge sessions. CD2 includes an exclusive acoustic version of "High", plus the video for "You're Beautiful" and "Making-Of" footage. The 7" vinyl includes an exclusive acoustic version of "So Long, Jimmy". The fourth physical format was an exclusive version of CD1, only available at HMV, which includes an additional third track, in the form of an acoustic version of "You're Beautiful". This version was also sold in Australia.

Track listing
 UK CD single number one
 "You're Beautiful" (Edit) – 3:22
 "Fall at Your Feet" (Acoustic) – 2:25

 UK CD single number two
 "You're Beautiful" (Edit) – 3:22
 "High" (Acoustic) – 4:03
 "You're Beautiful" (The Making of the Video) – 3:00
 "You're Beautiful" (Video) – 3:23

 UK 7" single
 "You're Beautiful" (Edit) – 3:22
 "So Long, Jimmy" (Acoustic) – 4:14

 Australian CD single
 "You're Beautiful" (Edit) – 3:22
 "Fall at Your Feet" (Acoustic) – 2:25
 "You're Beautiful" (Acoustic) – 3:35

 Japanese CD single
 "You're Beautiful" (The Q;indivi+ Remix) (featuring Keri) – 3:28

Release history

Charts

Weekly charts

Year-end charts

Decade-end charts

Certifications

See also
 List of number-one singles from the 2000s (UK)
 List of Hot 100 number-one singles of 2006 (U.S.)
 List of Billboard Adult Contemporary number ones of 2006
 "You're Pitiful", a parody by Weird Al Yankovic

References

Notes

General sources

 
 
 
 
 
 

2004 songs
2005 singles
James Blunt songs
Ultratop 50 Singles (Flanders) number-one singles
Number-one singles in the Czech Republic
Number-one singles in Denmark
European Hot 100 Singles number-one singles
Irish Singles Chart number-one singles
Dutch Top 40 number-one singles
Number-one singles in Norway
Number-one singles in Sweden
UK Singles Chart number-one singles
Billboard Hot 100 number-one singles
MTV Video Music Award for Best Male Video
Rock ballads
Pop ballads
Songs written by Amanda Ghost
Songs written by James Blunt
Songs written by Sacha Skarbek
Atlantic Records singles
Custard Records singles
Songs based on actual events
2000s ballads
Song recordings produced by Tom Rothrock
Music videos shot in Spain